Mount Joy GO Station is a railway station and bus station in the GO Transit network located in the City of Markham, Ontario, Canada. It is located in the community of Mount Joy, north of the old town of Markham, at the intersection of Markham Road and Bur Oak Avenue and is a stop on the Stouffville line train service. It is also the northern terminus of most of the Stouffville line's off-peak train services.

Connecting transit

GO Transit
 York University GO Bus Service; Eastern Terminus of Route 54 (Highway 407 East Service, Markham-Hwy 407 Bus Terminal branch)
 Routes 70 and 71 (Stouffville GO Train-Bus Service) which provide off-peak and contra-peak service.

York Region Transit
 18 Bur Oak eastbound to Markham Stouffville Hospital and westbound to Angus Glen Community Centre (No late evening or Sunday service)
303 Bur Oak Express runs east along Bur Oak Avenue to the community of Cornell before running express to Finch Station. (rush hours only, AM to Finch, PM from Finch)
 304 Mount Joy Express runs in the communities west and southwest of the station before running express to Finch Station. (rush hours only, AM to Finch, PM from Finch)

Toronto Transit Commission
 Markham Road to Warden Station.
This route is operated by the TTC on behalf of YRT. A YRT fare is charged when the bus is in Markham and a TTC fare charged when the bus is in Toronto (i.e. South of Steeles Avenue)

References

External links

GO Transit railway stations
Railway stations in Markham, Ontario
Year of establishment missing
Railway stations in Canada opened in 2004
2004 establishments in Ontario